Louise (French) or Louiza (Dutch) is a Brussels Metro station on the southern segment of lines 2 and 6. It opened on 19 August 1985 and is located under the Small Ring (Brussels' inner ring road) at the /, at the end of Avenue Louise/Louizalaan, in the municipality of the City of Brussels, Belgium.

The above station was used as a filming location of the music video for Stromae's song Formidable in 2013.

References

Notes

External links

Brussels metro stations
Railway stations opened in 1985
City of Brussels
1985 establishments in Belgium